Serra is a Pontic Greek war dance of ancient Greek origin, from the Pontus region of the Black Sea. Its name comes from the Serra river, in the region of Trapezounda. It is also called Pyrrhichios.

The Serra is a men's dance, danced hand by hand. The Pontic Lyra often accompanies this dance.

This dance is sometimes confused with Atsiapat, which precedes it. It is danced in sequence and followed by the Pyrrhichios dance.

See also
Greek dances
Greek music
Korybantes

References

External links
 Serra
 
Pontian "Serra" Pyrrhic dance with kemence / Lyra - Dora Stratou Dance Group, 1979

Greek war dances
Pontic Greek dances